Michael Ware (born March 22, 1967 in York, Ontario) is a Canadian former professional ice hockey player who played for the Edmonton Oilers, as well as in Europe, where he was primarily an enforcer.

Playing career
Ware began his major junior career with the Hamilton Steelhawks of the OHL in 1984, having been drafted 26th overall in the 1984 OHL priority selection. At the end of his rookie season with the Steelhawks, he was selected by the Edmonton Oilers, 62nd overall in the 
1985 NHL Entry Draft. He played a second season in Hamilton, before moving to the Cornwall Royals. Following his season in Eastern Ontario he turned professional.

Ware signed with the Oilers AHL affiliate Nova Scotia Oilers where he registered 253 PIM and 8 points as a rookie during the 1987-88 season. The farm team would relocate within the province, and become the Cape Breton Oilers. Ware remained the with team, but also played two games in the NHL, making his debut in January 1989 in a game against the Los Angeles Kings, where early in his first (and only) shift of the night, he fought Jay Miller. In his next game against the Vancouver Canucks, Ware would register what would be his only point in the NHL, an assist on a Miroslav Fryčer goal. Whilst playing for the affiliate team, his production increased, tallying 12 points and 317 PIM whilst in Cape Breton. The 1989-90 season would again see Ware primarily play in Cape Breton, whilst also playing 3 games in NHL. Ware would return to Nova Scotia for the 1990-91 season, registering 12 points and  176 PIM in 43 games. During his time in Cape Breton, Ware received a 20 game suspension for breaking his stick over the glass, and subsequently throwing it at a referee.

For the 1991-92 season, Ware moved to the U.K. in order to play for the Murrayfield Racers of the British Hockey League. In Edinburgh he would have a stellar season, scoring 60 points in 33 games, whilst also accruing 218 PIM. The team would finish 2nd in the league, before being beaten 9-0 in the playoff semifinals to eventual champions the Cardiff Devils. Ware would return to the Racers for the following season, again increasing his scoring output, with 71 points in 43 games; the team would finish mid-table and wouldn't make it out the group stages during the playoffs. The team would change its name to the Edinburgh Racers for the 1994-95 season, which would see Ware have a career year, with 79 points in 40 games, and would also see the Racers make it to the playoff final, ultimately losing to the Sheffield Steelers. The following season, Ware would remain in the BHL, but would move to the Cardiff Devils, beginning his association with the club. The Devils would have a strong season, finishing 2nd in the league, however, would crash out in the group stages of the playoffs.

Following the culmination of the 1995-96 season, the BHL would fold, and the BISL would take its place as the top-tier of hockey in the U.K, of which Cardiff were a founding member. Ware remained with the team and was named captain. In the maiden BISL season, The Devils were named league champions, however they lost in the play semifinals to eventual winners Sheffield Steelers. Ware would subsequently join the Steelers in the off-season, however, the team would struggle, thanks in no small part to the Ayr Scottish Eagles completing the British Grand Slam. For the 1998-99 season, Ware would move to Germany, to play for DEL side Hannover Scorpions. There, Ware managed only 6 points in 44 games, whilst registering 103 PIM. Ware returned the U.K. the following season, signing for the London Knights. With the Knights, Ware totalled 8 points and 90 PIM in 26 games, as the Knights would be crowned British champions after beating the Newcastle Riverkings 7-3 in the playoff final.

Ware returned to the Devils for the 2000-01 season, where he registered 10 points and 155 PIM in 40 games. The team would perform well, finishing 2nd in the league, however, they wouldn't make it passed the group stages in the playoffs.  However, at the end of the season the Cardiff Devils went into voluntary liquidation, and as a result were stripped of their BISL franchise. The team would eventually reform and participate in the British National League, which was at the time the second tier of Ice Hockey in the UK. As a result, Ware moved back to the London Knights for the following season, linking up with former Devils teammates Ian MacIntyre, Kim Ahlroos, Steve Thornton and Vezio Sacratini. The team would struggle, finishing 6th out of 7 teams, with Ware producing only 6 points and 33 PIM in 35 games.

The Terminator, as he was known to fans, returned to the Welsh capital for the third time and was named team captain for the 2002-03 season. The Devils made it to the BNL finals, ultimately losing to the Coventry Blaze. Ware had a good season, tallying 32 points and 96 PIM in 30 games.

Following the culmination of the 2002-03 season, the London Knights, as well as the Manchester Storm and Ayr Scottish Eagles all folded, whilst the Bracknell Bees dropped down the BNL. This resulted in the demise of the BISL. Cardiff would be a founding member of the EIHL, which became the new top-tier of hockey in the U.K., and as such Ware remained with the team for the inaugural EIHL season where he remained as team captain. During the season, the Devils awarded Ware a testimonial game as a result of his service with the team, and popularity with the fans. The team would make it to the playoff semi finals, before losing to the Sheffield Steelers, following which Ware retired from hockey.

Awards and achievements
 BISL League champion (1997)
 British champion (2000)

Career statistics

Personal life
Ware's nephew Phil Oreskovic, was also a professional hockey player, having played 10 games for the Toronto Maple Leafs, as well as in various North American minor leagues.

References

External links

1967 births
Living people
Canadian ice hockey right wingers
Canadian expatriate ice hockey players in England
Canadian expatriate ice hockey players in Scotland
Canadian expatriate ice hockey players in Wales
Canadian expatriate ice hockey players in Germany
Cape Breton Oilers players
Cardiff Devils players
Cornwall Royals (OHL) players
Edmonton Oilers draft picks
Edmonton Oilers players
Florida Hammerheads players
Hamilton Steelhawks players
Hannover Scorpions players
Ice hockey people from Toronto
London Knights (UK) players
Murrayfield Racers players
Nova Scotia Oilers players
People from York, Toronto
Sheffield Steelers players